The 2021 Air Force Falcons football team represented the United States Air Force Academy in the 2021 NCAA Division I FBS football season. The Falcons were led by 15th–year head coach Troy Calhoun and played their home games at Falcon Stadium in Colorado Springs, Colorado. They competed as members of the Mountain Division of the Mountain West Conference.

Previous season
The Falcons finished the 2020 season 3–3 and 2–2 in Mountain West play. They were not invited to play in any post season bowl game.

Preseason

Mountain West media days
The Mountain West media days were held on July 21–22, 2021, at the Cosmopolitan in Paradise, Nevada.

Media poll
The preseason poll was released on July 21, 2021. The Falcons were predicted to finish in third place in the MW Mountain Division.

Schedule

Personnel

Rankings

Game summaries

Lafayette

at Navy

Utah State

Florida Atlantic

at New Mexico

Wyoming

at Boise State

No. 22 San Diego State

vs. Army

at Colorado State

at Nevada

UNLV

References

Air Force
Air Force Falcons football seasons
First Responder Bowl champion seasons
Air Force Falcons football